The Lutheran Council of Great Britain is a Lutheran organization in Great Britain. It is a member of the Lutheran World Federation, by which it was recognized in 1989. It is affiliated with the Churches Together in Britain and Ireland and Churches Together in England. Member churches include the Nordic churches in London, Synod of German-Speaking Lutheran, Reformed and United Congregations in Great Britain, Estonian Evangelical Lutheran Church, Latvian Evangelical Lutheran Church in Great Britain, as well as the Lutheran Church in Great Britain.

External links 
Official website

Lutheran organizations
Lutheran World Federation members
Lutheranism in the United Kingdom
Organisations based in the London Borough of Camden
Religion in the London Borough of Camden